Matthew Gregory Wise (born 15 May 1966) is an English actor and producer. He has appeared in several British television programmes and feature films. He played the role of John Willoughby in Sense and Sensibility, which also starred Emma Thompson, whom he later married.

Early life and education 
Wise was born on 15 May 1966 in Newcastle upon Tyne to architect parents Douglass Wise and Yvonne Jeannine Czeiler. He was educated at the independent St Peter's School, York. He went to Heriot-Watt University in Edinburgh to study architecture and performed at Bedlam Theatre. Wise studied drama at the Royal Scottish Academy of Music and Drama.

Career 

His first professional job was on stage, starring in Good Rockin' Tonight, a musical based on TV producer Jack Good's life.

His television work includes four BBC period dramas: The Moonstone with Keeley Hawes, The Buccaneers alongside Carla Gugino, Madame Bovary with Frances O'Connor, The Riff Raff Element in 1992 and 1993, and as Sir Charles Maulver in the 2007 five-part series Cranford. In 1999 he starred as Marshall in ITV's seven-part drama Wonderful You alongside his future mother-in-law Phyllida Law and future brother-in-law Richard Lumsden.
He filmed a number of readings of love scenes from a selection of classic and modern love scenes, from Thomas Hardy's Tess of the d'Urbervilles to Kiran Desai's The Inheritance of Loss for The Carte Noire Readers. In 2011, he appeared in Hallmark Channel's Honeymoon for One, starring Nicollette Sheridan.

He is also the producer of the 2010 BBC/Masterpiece production The Song of Lunch starring his wife, actress Emma Thompson, and Alan Rickman.

In February 2015, Wise made his theatrical return starring in Brad Fraser's Kill Me Now at the Park Theatre in Finsbury Park, London. In July 2015, he played the role of emotionally distanced father Gilbert Aldridge in the BBC's two-part television adaptation of Sadie Jones’ debut novel The Outcast.  Wise portrayed Lord Louis Mountbatten in series 1 and 2 (2016/17) of Netflix's The Crown.

Wise won the celebrity version of The Great British Bake Off in aid of Stand Up to Cancer in 2019.

In 2021, Wise was a contestant on nineteenth series of Strictly Come Dancing. He was partnered with Karen Hauer and the couple were eliminated in the fourth week.

Personal life 
Wise has been in a relationship with actress Emma Thompson since 1995, when they met on the set of Sense and Sensibility. Their daughter Gaia was conceived through IVF and was born in 1999. They married in 2003, and that same year, they informally adopted Tindyebwa Agaba, a Rwandan orphan and former child soldier.

Filmography

Film

Television

References

External links

1966 births
Living people
20th-century English male actors
21st-century English male actors
Alumni of Heriot-Watt University
Alumni of the Royal Conservatoire of Scotland
English male film actors
English male television actors
Male actors from Newcastle upon Tyne
People educated at St Peter's School, York